Thirteen Against Fate is a British mystery thriller series, comprising thirteen individual stories by the Belgian writer, Georges Simenon. There are no links between each story, other than the original author, and no story features Simenon's most famous creation, Jules Maigret. Intended to be more of a psychological series than the usual British detective serial of the time, The Daily Telegraph described the first episode as "[a]n intelligent television crime series that concentrates on the character of the criminal instead of the almost invariably successful process of detection is overdue."

Episode list

The Lodger (transmitted 19 June 1966)
Writer: Hugh Leonard 
Director: James Ferman
Principal Cast: Zia Mohyeddin, Gwendolyn Watts, Gemma Jones, Nicolas Chagrin, Clive Cazes, Neil Wilson
Based on the Simenon story "Le Locataire" (1934)

Trapped (transmitted 26 June 1966)
Writer: Julia Jones 
Director: George Spenton-Foster
Principal Cast: Ronald Lewis, Keith Buckley, Sylvia Coleridge, Tenniel Evans, John Barrard, Donald Eccles, Geoffrey Cheshire, Derek Martin
Based on "Cours d’Assises" (1941)

The Traveller (transmitted 3 July 1966)
Writer: Stanley Miller
Director: Herbert Wise
Principal Cast: Kenneth J. Warren, Hywel Bennett, André van Gyseghem, Alan Lake, Kevin Stoney, Joan Young, Edward Burnham, Michael Hawkins, Jocelyn Birdsall
Based on "Le Voyageur de la Toussaint" (1941)

The Widower (transmitted 10 July 1966)
Writeript: Clive Exton 
Director: Silvio Narizzano
Principal Cast: Joss Ackland, Henry Gilbert, Patricia Healey, Aimée Delamain
Based on "Le Veuf" (1959)

The Judge (transmitted 17 July 1966)
Writer: Hugh Leonard 
Director: Naomi Capon
Principal Cast: Alexander Knox, John Ronane, Peter Howell, Erik Chitty, Keith Pyott, Wolfe Morris, Rosamund Greenwood
Based on "Les Témoins" (1955)

The Schoolmaster (transmitted 24 July 1966)
Writer: Alun Richards
Director: Peter Potter
Principal Cast: Stephen Murray, Helen Cherry, Cyril Shaps, Denis Carey, John Caesar, Petra Markham, Russell Waters, Robin Scott
Based on "L’Evadé" (1936)

The Witness (transmitted 31 July 1966)
Writer: John Hale 
Director: John Gorrie
Principal Cast: Pamela Brown, Daphne Heard, Moultrie Kelsall, Barry Jackson, Sheila Grant, Christopher Burgess, Basil Moss, Will Stampe, Trevor Baxter, Reginald Barratt
Based on "Le Haut Mal" (1933)

The Friends (transmitted 7 August 1966)
Writer: Anthony Steven
Director: Michael Hayes
Principal Cast: Jessica Dunning, Frederick Jaeger, Sandor Elès, Joby Blanshard, Michael Robbins, Edward Dentith
Based on "Chemin sans issue" (1938)

The Survivors (transmitted 14 August 1966)
Writer: Stanley Miller
Director: Rudolph Cartier
Principal Cast: Lila Kedrova, David Buck, Kathleen Breck, Frank Williams, Terence De Marney, Hamilton Dyce, Jerold Wells, Michael Brennan
Based on "Les Rescapés du Télémaque" (1938)

The Son (transmitted 21 August 1966)
Writer: Jeremy Paul 
Director: Waris Hussein
Principal Cast: Joan Miller, Simon Ward, Jack Woolgar, Clive Dunn, Lila Kaye, Alan Curtis, John Tillinger, Kevin Manser
Based on "Les Destins des Malous" (1947)

The Murderer (transmitted 28 August 1966)
Writer: Clive Exton
Director: Alan Bridges
Principal Cast: Frank Finlay, Michael Goodliffe, Annette Crosbie, Lyndon Brook, Jeremy Spenser, Norman Mitchell, Stephanie Bidmead, John Gill
Based on "L’Assassin" (1937)

The Suspect (transmitted 4 September 1966)
Writer: Donal Giltinan
Director: Michael Hayes.
Principal Cast: Marius Goring, Mary Miller, Peter Halliday, David Garfield, Noel Johnson, Jon Rollason, John Forgeham
Based on "Les Fiançailles de M. Hire" (1933)

The Consul (transmitted 11 September 1966)
Writer: 
Director: John Gorrie.
Principal Cast: Jonathan Burn, Michele Dotrice, Jeannette Sterke, Michael Pennington, John Ringham, Andreas Malandrinos, Geoffrey Beevers, John Brandon, John Savident, Michael Lynch.
Based on “Les Gens d’en Face” (1933)

Archive status

Long thought almost entirely lost, the entire series was recovered from the British Film Institute (three episodes) and the American Library of Congress (ten episodes) by 2010.

References

External links
 

1960s British drama television series
1966 British television series debuts
1966 British television series endings
English-language television shows
Espionage television series
BBC Television shows
Television shows based on works by Georges Simenon
BBC mystery television shows